Eduardo Villanueva Manalo (born October 31, 1955, in Quezon City, Philippines) also known as Ka Eduardo is the current Executive Minister of the Iglesia ni Cristo (INC). He is the third generation of the Manalo family to lead the church following his father, the late Eraño G. Manalo, and his grandfather, Felix Y. Manalo.

Personal life
Eduardo Villanueva Manalo was born on October 31, 1955, in Quezon City Philippines to Eraño G. Manalo and Cristina Villanueva. His name literally means "guardian" as what his grandfather Felix Y. Manalo gave him. He was married to Babylyn Ventura on January 2, 1982, whom he met when studying at the University of the Philippines, and had three children named Dorothy Kristine, Gemma Minna and Angelo Eraño. Dorothy, their eldest, graduated summa cum laude with a bachelor's degree in Philosophy and Law at the University of the Philippines, married to Theoben Orosa, and now serves as INC Corporate Secretary and Chairman of the Board of Directors of New Era University (NEU). Gemma, their second child earned her bachelor's degree in Music Education at the University of the Philippines, married to Antonio de Guzman Jr., and now serves as INC Overall Choir Coordinator and Head of INC Music Department (which was previously held by Pilar Manalo Danao and later, Liberty Manalo-Albert). Angelo Eraño, their last child, is currently a minister of the gospel, serving as Overall Coordinator of the INC Christian Family Organizations and CEO of the Christian Era Broadcasting Service Incorporated, married to Janica Mae Mangunay, daughter of a minister.

Education
Eduardo Manalo graduated high school from Jose Abad Santos Memorial School, Quezon City. He took his college education from the University of the Philippines Diliman with a degree of Bachelor of Arts in Philosophy. While pursuing his undergraduate studies in UP, he undertook his ministerial studies at the Evangelical College, the predecessor of the New Era University- College of Evangelical Ministry (now Iglesia ni Cristo School For Ministers). He graduated from UP in 1978, and from EVCO in 1980.

Early years in the ministry 

After graduating from EVCO, his first assignment was in the INC's Local Congregation of Cubao in Quezon City. He was ordained as a minister on May 9, 1980, at the INC house of worship in Tondo, Manila. After a brief assignment in the Local Congregation of Project 4, Quezon City, he was appointed Assistant Dean of EVCO. He hosted a religious radio program over DZEC and was one of the first panelists on the TV program, Ang Iglesia ni Cristo. His administrative capability was further honed as a Coordinator of the Metro Manila Ecclesiastical Districts (at the present, Metro Manila was divided into eight (8) districts) beginning in 1984:
 Caloocan North
 Camanava
 Central
 Makati
 Maynila
 Metro Manila East
 Metro Manila South
 Quezon City

Information and communication technology involvement
Eduardo Manalo founded the Society of Communicators and Networkers (SCAN) for INC members with a common interest in radio communication to help and assists the community during emergencies. He also began and maintained a popular Bulletin Board System (BBS) and further developed his programming skills. He organized the Data and Network Management (DNM) office, which oversaw the computerization of the entire INC Central Office. He sponsored Internet seminars for ministers in various ecclesiastical districts of the church. In an article "RP marks 7th year on the Internet" in the March 2001 edition of the magazine Computerworld Philippines, Filipino information technology enthusiasts recognized Eduardo Manalo as belonging to the "group of pioneers that brought the nation into the Internet Age".

He contributed to the founding of an organization within the INC called The Association of Christians in Information Technology, an organization consisting of INC members in the Information technology field who perform computer-related assistance to the church. This organization was renamed and became the Association of Computer Technologists and Information Volunteers (ACTIV) on 2012.

Deputy Executive Minister (1994-2009)

On May 7, 1994, Eduardo V. Manalo assumed his responsibility as Deputy Executive Minister of the Iglesia ni Cristo after being elected unanimously by the Church Executive Council at the Central Temple. As a Deputy Executive Minister, he will be the successor of the Office of the Executive Minister and also has the task to temporarily assume the duties of Executive Minister during the latter's absence. He was entrusted with the task of registering the INC officially in Rome, Italy, in 1994. In 1996, along with 11 ministers, he joined the then Executive Minister Eraño G. Manalo in establishing the INC's local congregation in Jerusalem, Israel. In 1997, he also accompanied on establishing the congregation in Athens, Greece.

Over the months of July to August 1998, he conducted a pastoral visitation to Hawaii and the US in commemoration of the 30th year of the INC in the West. Another major pastoral visitation took place over the months of April to May 2006, to the local congregations in Europe, Middle East, and Asia.

Administration
In thirteen years (2009-2022) of leadership of the Church since Eduardo V. Manalo assumed the office as the Church's Executive Minister on September 7, 2009, INC has ordained 4,522 ministerial workers to become new ministers [from January 2, 2010, in Templo Central (Central) to October 14, 2022, in San Fernando (Pampanga East)] with almost 6,000 ministerial students to become future ministers in Iglesia Ni Cristo School For Ministers for Academic Year 2022-2023. 16 New Extensions of the School For Ministers added (9 in the Philippines and 7 abroad). INC has ordained 15 Head Deacons to become new Bishops assigned in the Locale Congregation [from May 23, 2015, in Las Piñas (Metro Manila South) to February 15, 2020, in Pamplona (Metro Manila South)]. Opened 1,228 new local congregations with 1,434 new extensions being groomed to become local congregations, 63 additional countries and territories reached by the Church, 78 ecclesiastical districts. There are 181 Ecclesiastical Districts of INC in this current. and 3 main offices:
 Burlingame, California, USA [US West Office]
 Washington D.C., USA [US East Office]
 Heathrow, London, United Kingdom [Europe Main Office]
18 administrative infrastructure projects were inaugurated within thirteen years from the time he assumed his office (September 7, 2009, to March 15, 2022).
On January 2, 2010, he ordained 202 newly ministers at Central Temple to commemorate the 85th birthday of Eraño G. Manalo. In the worldwide, where INC Engineering and Construction Department undertakes the church's construction projects was dedicated, total of 3,691 from September 7, 2009, to December 16, 2022, to spreadout the Dynamic Leadership of Eduardo Manalo. The biggest house of worship outside the Philippines can be found in Barcelona, Spain which can accommodate 1,360 worshipers at a time. INC bought the property from Jehovah's Witnesses and it was dedicated in July 2012. The most expensive house of worship of the INC can be found in Washington DC. Acquisition and renovations costed more than US$10.6 million. The property includes a school building which was formerly owned by Helen and Constantine Greek Orthodox Church. The house of worship was dedicated in December 2012.

On July 21, 2014, Philippine president Benigno Aquino III and Manalo led the inauguration of Ciudad de Victoria, a 140-hectare tourism zone in Bocaue and Santa Maria, Bulacan, where the Philippine Arena is also located. The Philippine Arena, a 55,000-seater multi-purpose structure, touted as the world's largest indoor domed arena (by seating capacity), was constructed for the INC's centennial celebration on July 27, 2014.

On March 14, 2014, after conducting a worship service in Tacloban, Leyte, INC Executive Minister Eduardo V. Manalo, led the groundbreaking ceremony of EVM Self-Sustainable Community Rehabilitation Project in Sitio New Era, a 3,000-hectare property of the church in Brgy. Langit, Alangalang, Leyte. The project which could cost more than one billion pesos includes at least 1,000 housing units for the survivors of super typhoon Haiyan. Garments and dried fish factories, and eco-farming project are also included to provide livelihood to the community. More than 150,000 hunger relief packages were also given which contained 3 kilos of rice, canned goods and instant noodles aside from the free medical and dental services conducted that day.

He was the Executive Minister who visited the continents of:
Africa > 2014, 2016 and 2017
Australia > 2011, 2014, 2016 and 2017
South America > 2017

He was the Executive Minister who officiated the Ordination of New Ministers outside the Philippines; in the Locale Congregation of Humble, Texas, USA last December 28, 2011.

He was the Executive Minister who officiated the International Conference of Ministers, Ministerial Workers and Ministerial Students outside the Philippines in the Continent of America; in the Locale Congregation of Sacramento, California, USA last December 30, 2013.

He was the Executive Minister who officiated the Holy Supper Worship Service outside the Philippines; in the Locale Congregation of Seattle, Washington, USA last February 28, 2015.

Manalo was appointed by President Rodrigo Duterte as Special Envoy for Overseas Filipino Concerns succeeding Roy Cimatu who held the position. Manalo's tenure began on January 30, 2018, and ended on January 29, 2019.

Media portrayal
Portrayed by Dale Baldillo in the 2015 film, Felix Manalo

See also
2015 Iglesia ni Cristo leadership controversy

References

External links
Iglesia ni Cristo Media Services
Iglesia ni Cristo Official Website

1955 births
Living people
Filipino Christian religious leaders
Tagalog people
Eduardo V.
University of the Philippines Diliman alumni
New Era University alumni
Duterte administration personnel